The Cupa Ligii was Romania's secondary club football tournament. Like the Cupa României, it was played on a knockout (single elimination) basis.

History 

It is unclear when the competition was first created, as there are no official recordings. It probably started sometime after 1990, but there may already have been an edition as early as 1978. Cupa Ligii was meant to shorten the break between the end of the league season and the start of a major international competition. It had a friendly character and was last played in 2000 before being dropped.

In April 2014, it was taken the decision to reestablish the competition, this time with official character, starting with the 2014–15 edition. Managed by the Liga Profesionistă de Fotbal (LPF), only teams from the Romanian top division were allowed to take part. FCSB (twice) and Dinamo București were winners of the cup before being abolished again in 2017.

Finals (2014–2017)
There were three previous friendly cups held in 1994, 1998 and 2000. Those were won by Rapid București, FCM Bacău and Gloria Bistrița.

Broadcasters
From the 2014–15 season to the 2018–19 season, sister channels Look TV and Look Plus were meant to broadcast Cupa Ligii. The matches could have also been viewed on Digi Sport and Dolce Sport.

References

External links
Cupa Ligii info
Structure of the Cupa Ligii for the 2014–15 season 

 
2
National association football league cups
cup
Recurring sporting events established in 2014
Recurring sporting events disestablished in 2017
2014 establishments in Romania
2017 disestablishments in Romania